Hemiscopis suffusalis is a moth in the family Crambidae. It was described by Francis Walker in 1866. It is found in Sri Lanka, Taiwan, Indonesia (Sumatra, Papua New Guinea), Australia and the Philippines.

References

Moths described in 1866
Odontiinae